Shelby Printemps (born 10 August 1990) is a professional footballer who plays for German club Türkgücü Friedberg, as a striker. Born in the United States, he represented Haiti at international level.

Career
Born in Miami, United States, Printemps has played for Miami FC, Rocha, Għajnsielem, Vancouver Whitecaps FC U-23, FSV Optik Rathenow, Bhayangkara, St Joseph's, Panelefsiniakos, SV FC Sandzak Frankfurt, Sportfreunde Schwäbisch Hall and FSV Optik Rathenow.

He made his international debut for Haiti in 2015.

References

1990 births
Living people
American soccer players
Citizens of Haiti through descent
Haitian footballers
Haiti international footballers
Fort Lauderdale Strikers players
Rocha F.C. players
Għajnsielem F.C. players
Vancouver Whitecaps FC U-23 players
FSV Optik Rathenow players
Bhayangkara F.C. players
St Joseph's F.C. players
Panelefsiniakos F.C. players
Oberliga (football) players
Gibraltar Premier Division players
Football League (Greece) players
Association football forwards